Franjo Bučar State Award for Sport is the highest recognition that Republic of Croatia gives for extraordinary achievements and contributions of remarkable meaning for the development of sport in Croatia.

This award has been given since 1991. It came as successor of awards of SR Croatia: Majska nagrada fizičke kulture and Republička nagrada fizičke kulture.

This award is given to professional and public workers in the area of sport, sportsmen, legal and physical entities the perform sports activity, as well as other entities whose work is meritorious for the development of sport.

It is named after Croatian writer and sports activist Franjo Bučar, person that popularized sport in Croatia in many ways.

Winners

References

Croatian awards
Sports trophies and awards
Awards established in 1991
1991 establishments in Croatia